Dereje Nedi (born January 13, 1954) is a retired male long-distance runner from Ethiopia. He represented his native country at the 1980 Summer Olympics in the men's marathon. He set his personal best (2:10:31) in the classic distance on August 18, 1984, winning the marathon race at the Friendship Games in Moscow.

International competitions

References

External links

1954 births
Living people
Ethiopian male long-distance runners
Ethiopian male marathon runners
Olympic athletes of Ethiopia
Athletes (track and field) at the 1980 Summer Olympics
World Athletics Championships athletes for Ethiopia
Frankfurt Marathon male winners
African Games silver medalists for Ethiopia
African Games medalists in athletics (track and field)
Athletes (track and field) at the 1978 All-Africa Games
Athletes (track and field) at the 1987 All-Africa Games
Friendship Games medalists in athletics
20th-century Ethiopian people
21st-century Ethiopian people